The following is a partial list of the "D" codes for Medical Subject Headings (MeSH), as defined by the United States National Library of Medicine (NLM).

This list covers glycoproteins. For other protein-related codes, see List of MeSH codes (D12.776).

Codes before these are found at List of MeSH codes (D12.776) § MeSH D12.776.377.856. Codes following these are found at List of MeSH codes (D12.776) § MeSH D12.776.402. For other MeSH codes, see List of MeSH codes.

The source for this content is the set of 2006 MeSH Trees from the NLM.

– glycoproteins

– activins

– inhibin-beta subunits

– adam proteins

– alpha 1-antichymotrypsin

– asialoglycoproteins

– avidin

– clusterin

– colony-stimulating factors

– colony-stimulating factors, recombinant
 – granulocyte colony stimulating factor, recombinant
 – filgrastim
 – granulocyte macrophage colony-stimulating factors, recombinant

– erythropoietin
 – erythropoietin, recombinant
 – epoetin alfa

– granulocyte colony-stimulating factor
 – granulocyte colony stimulating factor, recombinant
 – filgrastim

– granulocyte-macrophage colony-stimulating factor
 – granulocyte macrophage colony-stimulating factors, recombinant

– interleukin-3

– macrophage colony-stimulating factor

– thrombopoietin

– hemopexin

– inhibins

– inhibin-beta subunits

– lactoferrin

– membrane glycoproteins

– antigens, cd47

– antigens, cd86

– atp-binding cassette transporters
 – p-glycoproteins
 – p-glycoprotein

– antigens, cd55

– antigens, cd58

– antigens, cd59

– antigens, cd147

– antigens, thy-1

– ca-15-3 antigen

– cd40 ligand

– cell adhesion molecules
 – antigens, cd22
 – antigens, cd24
 – antigens, cd31
 – antigens, cd146
 – antigens, cd164
 – cadherins
 – desmosomal cadherins
 – desmocollins
 – desmogleins
 – desmoglein 1
 – desmoglein 2
 – desmoglein 3
 – carcinoembryonic antigen
 – cd4 immunoadhesins
 – cell adhesion molecules, neuronal
 – cell adhesion molecules, neuron-glia
 – activated-leukocyte cell adhesion molecule
 – myelin p0 protein
 – neural cell adhesion molecules
 – antigens, cd56
 – neural cell adhesion molecule l1
 – integrin alphaxbeta2
 – intercellular adhesion molecule-1
 – receptors, lymphocyte homing
 – antigens, cd44
 – integrin alpha4beta1
 – lymphocyte function-associated antigen-1
 – l-selectin
 – selectins
 – e-selectin
 – l-selectin
 – p-selectin
 – vascular cell adhesion molecule-1

– fibronectins

– gap-43 protein

– kangai-1 protein

– laminin

– lysosome-associated membrane glycoproteins
 – lysosomal-associated membrane protein 1
 – lysosomal-associated membrane protein 2

– myelin-associated glycoprotein

– platelet membrane glycoproteins
 – antigens, cd36
 – integrin alpha2beta1
 – integrin alpha5beta1
 – integrin alpha6beta1
 – integrin alphavbeta3
 – lysosomal-associated membrane protein 1
 – platelet glycoprotein gpib-ix complex
 – platelet glycoprotein gpiib-iiia complex
 – receptors, thrombin
 – platelet glycoprotein gpib-ix complex
 – receptor, par-1
 – thrombomodulin
 – p-selectin

– synaptophysin

– thrombospondins
 – thrombospondin 1

– variant surface glycoproteins, trypanosoma

– mucoproteins

– cell wall skeleton

– haptoglobins

– intrinsic factor

– mucins
 – ca-15-3 antigen
 – gastric mucin
 – sialomucins
 – antigens, cd43
 – antigens, cd164

– orosomucoid

– ovomucin

– peptidoglycan

– phytohemagglutinins

– myelin p0 protein

– osteonectin

– protein c

– protein s

– proteoglycans

– heparan sulfate proteoglycan

– platelet factor 4

– proteochondroitin sulfates

– serum amyloid p-component

– sialoglycoproteins

– antigens, cd43

– glycophorin

– thrombopoietin

– thyroglobulin

– thyroxine-binding proteins

– transcortin

– tumor necrosis factor-alpha

– uteroglobin

– vitronectin

The list continues at List of MeSH codes (D12.776) § MeSH D12.776.402.

D12.776.395